Natalia Lach-Lachowicz (18 April 1937 – 12 August 2022) was a Polish artist who worked with paint, photography, drawing, performance, and video art. Sean O'Hagan, writing in The Guardian in 2017, described her as "a neglected early-1970s Polish-born pioneer of feminist avant garde image making".

Biography
Natalia Lach-Lachowicz was born in Żywiec, Poland. From 1946 to 1956, Lach-Lachowicz lived in Bielsko-Biała where she completed basic and secondary education. From 1957 to 1963 she studied at the State College of Fine Arts (nowadays Eugeniusz Geppert Academy of Fine Arts) in Wrocław under the supervision of Professor S. Dawski, where she completed her MSc.

In 1970 she co-founded PERMAFO, an artists' group and gallery, with Zbigniew Dłubak and Andrzej Lachowicz. In 1971, after marrying Lachowicz, she assumed the name Natalia LL. Since 1975 she was engaged in the international feminist art movement and took part in various symposia and exhibitions.

Between 2004 and 2013 she was a senior lecturer at the University of Fine Arts in Poznań.

In 2018, the ZW Foundation was founded to preserve the works of Natalia LL as well as to provide a "place for exchanging scientific ideas and creative thoughts".

Work

Natalia LL was a conceptual artist and photographer, associated with the avant-garde scene of the 1960s in Poland. Through photography and video she deconstructed single-frame photographs and satirizes the images that were presented in advertising, television, and print in the 1970s and 1980s. Her series, Consumer Art (1972–1975), depicts close ups of women eating and biting foods like bananas, sausages, and melons. It is often read as a critique, questioning the common representation of women in pornography.  She said of it "Feminists saw in my consumer art a perverse struggle with the cult of the phallus and with masculinity. For me it was rather the manifestation of a feeling of life and liveliness." 

After suffering from a severe illness in the late 1970s, Natalia LL began to delve into transcendental and mythological subjects, often photographing her performances.

In April 2019, after an anonymous complaint, the Polish National Museum in Warsaw removed from an exhibition works by Natalia LL, Katarzyna Kozyra, and the duo formed by Karolina Wiktor and Aleksandra Kubiak. This act, which was seen as an act of censorship of feminist art, led to widespread protests; a movement termed "#bananagate."

Awards
Silver Medal, Medal for Merit to Culture – Gloria Artis, from the Ministry of Culture and National Heritage, Poland, 2007

Exhibitions

Solo exhibitions 

 Natalia LL. The Mysterious World, Francisco Carolinum, 2021
 Natalia LL. Intimate Photography, Galerie Steinek, Vienna, 2018
 Doing Gender, lokal_30, Warsaw, 2013
 Natalia LL – Opus Magnum, Ernst Múzeum, Budapest, 2012
 The Whole of the Parts, Galeria Wangarda BWA, Wrocław, 2005
 Ogrody personlizmu/Gardens of Personalism, Centrum Sztuki Współczesnej Zamek Ujazdowski, Warsaw, 1998
 Allusive Space, Frauenmuseum, Bonn, 1995
 Piramida/Pyramid, Galeria Spojrzenia, Wrocław, 1980

Group exhibitions 
Natalia LL, Józef Robakowski, Ewa Juszkiewicz, gallery lokal_30 at Frieze New York City, 2016
Gender Check, Femininity and Masculinity in the Art of Eastern Europe, mumok Museum Moderner Kunst – Stiftung Ludwig Vienna & Zachęta National Gallery of Art Warsaw
Rebelle: Art and Feminism 1969–2009, Museum voor Moderne Kunst, Arnhem, Netherlands, 2009
Darkside - Photographic Desire and Sexuality Photographed, Fotomuseum, Winterthur, 2008
La photographie polonaise, Centre Georges Pompidou, Paris, 1982
Bienal de São Paulo, Brazil, 1979

Photo gallery

References

Citations

Bibliography

Further reading 
Opera Omnia. Wrocław: , 2009. .

1937 births
2022 deaths
20th-century women photographers
21st-century women photographers
Polish contemporary artists
Polish photographers
Polish women artists
Recipients of the Silver Medal for Merit to Culture – Gloria Artis
People from Żywiec
Academic staff of the University of Fine Arts in Poznań